Let America Vote is a political action organization founded by former Missouri Secretary of State Jason Kander in February 2017. Its mission is to end voter suppression across the country.

Overview
Kander first became concerned about voter suppression during his tenure as Missouri Secretary of State, when the Republican-dominated state legislature proposed photo identification laws that could prevent as many as 200,000 eligible voters from voting. Kander founded Let America Vote three months after he had narrowly lost to Roy Blunt in the 2016 Senate race. Responding to the actions taken by the Trump administration (such as the Voter Fraud Commission), Let America Vote aims to create political consequences for politicians intent on denying certain Americans the right to vote, especially those that target low-income and minority voters. The group raised approximately $2.4 million in its first year, and has now established office branches in Iowa, New Hampshire, Georgia, Tennessee, and Nevada.

Board of Advisors 
Let America Vote is governed by a board of advisors consisting of voting rights activists, non-profit leaders, former Obama Administration officials, and Democratic politicians. Notable members include:

 Stacey Abrams
 Eli Attie
 Andy Berke
 Janet Cruz
 Crisanta Duran
 Josh Earnest
 Marc Elias
 Jon Favreau
 Lucy Flores
 Christine Greig
 Alison Lundergan Grimes
 Eric Johnson
 Martin Luther King III
 Linda McCulloch
 William McCurdy II
 Susana Mendoza
 Denise Merrill
 Dan Pfeiffer
 Samantha Power
 Cecile Richards
 Rebecca Rios
 Stephanie Schriock
 Bakari Sellers
 Zephyr Teachout
 Bradley Whitford

References

External links 
 Let America Vote official website

Let
Election and voting-related organizations based in the United States
Jason Kander
Non-profit organizations based in Washington, D.C.
Political organizations established in 2017
Political advocacy groups in the United States
Progressive organizations in the United States
Voter registration
Voter turnout organizations